Mitică Pricop (born 25 October 1977 in Constanţa) is a Romanian sprint canoer who competed from the late 1990s to 2004. Competing in two Summer Olympics, he won two medals at Sydney in 2000 with a gold in the C-2 1000 m and a bronze in the C-2 500 m events with Florin Popescu. The following year, they were double European champions over 500 m and 1000 m.

In 2002, Pricop won the World Championship gold as part of the Romania C-4 500 m team. The following year they crossed the line second at the world championships in Gainesville, Georgia, USA, but were later awarded the gold medal  after Russian Sergey Ulegin failed a doping test. Pricop won a total of eight medals at the ICF Canoe Sprint World Championships in his career.

Pricop later competed at the 2004 Summer Olympics in the C-1 1000 m event. He placed fourth in his initial heat with a time of 4:00.559, qualifying for the semifinals.  There, he placed fifth, this time at 3:59.640. He did not advance to the final.

Pricop, a member of the Dinamo Bucharest club, retired from international competition after the Athens Olympics.

References

External links
 

1977 births
Canoeists at the 2000 Summer Olympics
Canoeists at the 2004 Summer Olympics
Living people
Olympic canoeists of Romania
Olympic gold medalists for Romania
Olympic bronze medalists for Romania
Sportspeople from Constanța
Romanian male canoeists
Olympic medalists in canoeing
ICF Canoe Sprint World Championships medalists in Canadian
Medalists at the 2000 Summer Olympics